Marianne Cruz González (born April 23, 1985 in Salcedo) is a Dominican news presenter, model and beauty pageant titleholder who was crowned Miss Dominican Republic 2008 and represented her country at Miss Universe 2008.

Personal life 
Born in Santo Domingo, Dominican Republic, Marianne is the youngest of three sisters. Her parents were divorced when she was young.

At the age of 16, Cruz began mountain climbing. She has climbed the highest elevation of the West Indies, The Pico Duarte, in Dominican Republic. Cruz is studying fashion design at Santo Domingo, and is the voice of many charity campaigns in Dominican Republic.

Beauty Pageants

Miss Dominican Republic 2007
Cruz participated in the Miss Dominican Republic 2007 beauty pageant. Despite her popularity, and her being the favorite candidate during the competition, she lost to Massiel Taveras the candidate from the province of Santiago.

Miss Continente Americano
Later on Cruz went on to participate in the Miss Continente Americano 2007 beauty pageant. Cruz was declared the winner of Miss Continente Americano 2007 and was crowned by Mia Taveras of the Dominican Republic, becoming the first Miss Continente Americano to be crowned by a compatriot.

Miss Dominican Republic 2008
After competing once again for the title of Miss Dominican Republic, 22-year-old Marianne Cruz became Miss Dominican Republic 2008, receiving the crown from Massiel Taveras, Miss Dominican Republic Universe 2007 and gaining the right to represent the Dominican Republic at Miss Universe 2008.

Miss Universe 2008
After winning, she represented the Dominican Republic at Miss Universe 2008, where she finished as 2nd Runner-Up. This is the third highest position Dominican Republic has gotten in Miss Universe after Ada de la Cruz (Cruz' successor) placed 1st Runner-Up at Miss Universe 2009 and Amelia Vega won Miss Universe 2003. Cruz was also the second woman representing the Dominican Republic to place 2nd-Runner Up (the 1st was Renata Soñé in 2005).

Career in media

Cruz has appeared in several magazines and has been hosting special events. She has been on some fashion runways and had a special appearance on Premios Cassandra and in the Dominican movie Playball.

She has done several photoshoots for Dominican International fashion photographers.

Cruz is news anchor at Noticias SIN from 2010 to 2014, and then since 2014 at AN 7. She is also radio host on “El sol de los sábados”.

References 

1985 births
Living people
People from Hermanas Mirabal Province
Miss Universe 2008 contestants
Miss Dominican Republic
Dominican Republic beauty pageant winners
Dominican Republic people of Spanish descent
Television news anchors
White Dominicans